Tom Freestone is a former member of the Arizona State Senate. He served in the Senate from January 1997 through January 2001, representing the 30th District. Freestone also worked as a county supervisor from 1978 to 1992. He worked as a judge pro tem after leaving the senate.

Personal life
Freestone's father Bert served as a Mesa city councilor in the 1950s and 60s.

References

Republican Party Arizona state senators
1938 births
Living people